Refuge des Anges au Morion is a refuge in the Alps in Italy.

Mountain huts in the Alps
Mountain huts in Aosta Valley